Asim Munir may refer to:
Asim Munir (cricketer)
Asim Munir (general)